Black Money (Undisclosed Foreign Income and Assets) and Imposition of Tax Act, 2015 is an  Act of the Parliament of India. It aims to curb black money, or undisclosed foreign assets and income and imposes tax and penalty on such income. The Act has been passed by both the Houses of the Parliament. The Act has received the assent of the President of India on 26 May 2015. It came into effect from 1 July 2015.

Disclosure Opportunity 

The goal of this law is to bring back the income and assets held abroad back to the country. As a result, only an Indian resident gets the opportunity to declare undisclosed assets. However, an amendment was made in 2019 in the Act retrospectively, to cover even persons who are non-residents but were resident when the asset was acquired or income was earned outside India.

The government gives a time frame when someone can disclose assets. If the resident holding undisclosed assets declare the assets in the given time frame they are not subject to prosecution.

The resident may want to disclose assets when they have not submitted a return on time, or if they filled and submitted a return they chose not to include certain assets or even when the taxpayer did not provide all the facts and thus the return could not be evaluated.

There are instances when a taxpayer does not get the opportunity to disclose the income and assets. Information received on or before June 30, 2015, is not considered valid because of the date of the act. A resident with unsettled legal offense under the Indian law cannot disclose money. Disclosure opportunity is not available when the tax audit is still under surveillance with accordance to Indian tax laws.

Valuation 

The valuation of undisclosed assets will be done as per Rule 3 of Black Money (Undisclosed Foreign Income and Assets) and Imposition of Tax Rules, 2015.

Computation 

Under normal income tax act, taxpayers are subject to deduction but while computing for such undisclosed foreign assets and income no such deductions will be applicable. While computing, if the assets/income are movable then value computed will be used to calculate the tax but if it is taxed prior then that value would be subtracted from the undisclosed income/asset. In case of immovable object, computation keeps in mind the value at the first day of financial year.

Penalty

Related to undisclosed foreign income and assets   

The taxpayer holding undisclosed foreign income and assets is liable to pay a penalty which is three times the tax computed under section 10 of the article.

Related to default in payment of tax arrear   

If the taxpayer is in default, he/she is liable to pay a penalty which equals amount of tax arrears.

Related to other defaults   

If the taxpayer does not comply with the rules and officers and is subject to defaults then he/she is liable to pay a sum ranging from 50,000- 2,00,000 INR.

Related to failure in filing return   

If a person fails to file return before the end of that assessment year then he/she is subject to 10,00,000 INR penalty. There will be no penalty if the aggregate balance in one or more foreign bank account is less than 5,00,000 INR.

Related to failure to provide information or provide inaccurate particulars while filing 

If a person provides inaccurate information or does not provide information in general is subject to penalty of 10,00,000 INR. There will be no penalty if the aggregate balance in one or more foreign bank account is less than 5,00,000 INR.

See also

 List of Acts of the Parliament of India

References

External links
Bill as passed by Lok Sabha
Clarifications on Tax Compliance for Undisclosed Foreign Income and Assets: CBDT Circular No. 15 of 2015

Indian tax legislation
Anti-corruption measures in India
Tax evasion in India
Acts of the Parliament of India 2015
Black markets
2015 in Indian economy
Economic history of India (1947–present)